Thomas Neilson Bannan (13 April 1930 – 4 May 2004) was a Scottish professional footballer who scored 23 goals from 29 appearances in the Scottish Football League playing for Airdrieonians and Stenhousemuir, and 117 goals from 338 appearances in the English Football League playing for Wrexham, Lincoln City and Barrow. He played as a centre forward or inside right.

Football career
Bannan was born in Darngavel, near Airdrie in Lanarkshire. He played local football around Airdrie before joining the town's Scottish League club, Airdrieonians. Bannan made his debut in the 1948–49 season, and in his three seasons with the club he scored 18 goals from 21 League games, as well as spending a spell on loan to Stenhousemuir. In 1951 he moved south to play in the English Football League, signing for Wrexham of the Third Division North.

Bannan scored on his Wrexham debut, on 18 August 1951 against Chester. He became a regular in the first team, averaging 45 games a season in all competitions, and his goalscoring was such that he was their leading scorer in his second, third and fourth seasons, with 22, 18 and 19 goals respectively.

In 1955, he moved up a division to join Lincoln City. His first season with the club was relatively unsuccessful, but in his second season he finished as their leading scorer with 14 goals in League and FA Cup. He then returned to Wrexham for another two years. In 1958 he scored in every round of the Welsh Cup up to the final, then scored the winner in the replayed final to defeat Chester 2–1. In 1958–59, his last year with the club, he again finished as top scorer, this time with 17 goals.

Bannan finished his professional career with two seasons at Fourth Division club Barrow, who signed him for a fee of £1,500. He retired at the end of the 1960–61 season.

Bannan died on 4 May 2004 aged 74 and was buried with his wife Mary McKay at St Joseph's Cemetery, Rochsoles in Airdrie. In 2005, he was inducted into the Wrexham Supporters Association Hall of Fame.

References

1930 births
2004 deaths
Footballers from Airdrie, North Lanarkshire
Scottish footballers
Association football forwards
Airdrieonians F.C. (1878) players
Stenhousemuir F.C. players
Wrexham A.F.C. players
Lincoln City F.C. players
Barrow A.F.C. players
Scottish Football League players
English Football League players